The 2012 season was Geylang United FC's 18th consecutive season in the S.League. The club also competed in the Singapore Cup and the Singapore League Cup.

Squad

Pre-season

Mid-Season Transfers

In

Out

S.League

Round 1

Round 2

Singapore League Cup

Singapore Cup

References 

Geylang International
Geylang International FC seasons